Pyramidula kuznetsovi  is a species of small air-breathing land snail, a terrestrial pulmonate gastropod mollusc in the family Pyramidulidae.

Shell description 
The diameter of the shell is up to 2.6 mm, the height is up to 2.3 mm at 5.5 whorls. The presence of a distinct peripheral angle distinguishes this species from all other known species in this genus.

Distribution 
This species is known only from four closely grouped locations in the valley of the Kali Gandaki River between Dhaulagiri and Annapurna mountains, Mustang District of Nepal.

References

Pyramidulidae
Gastropods described in 2012